Harold Lloyd (12 March 1920 – 1984) was a Welsh footballer who played as a goalkeeper for Flint Town, Tranmere Rovers and Runcorn. He made 203 appearances for Tranmere.

References

1920 births
1984 deaths
People from Flint, Flintshire
Sportspeople from Flintshire
Association football goalkeepers
Welsh footballers
Flint Town United F.C. players
Tranmere Rovers F.C. players
Runcorn F.C. Halton players
English Football League players